Deserticossus decoratus is a moth in the family Cossidae. It is found in Kazakhstan.

The length of the forewings is 18–21 mm. The forewings are grey with a spot in the discal and postdiscal areas and a row of dark strokes along the costal margin. The hindwings are black with a grey anal area.

References

Natural History Museum Lepidoptera generic names catalog

Cossinae
Moths described in 2006
Moths of Asia